Florence Independent School District is a public school district based in Florence, Texas (USA).

Located in Williamson County, a small portion of the district extends into Bell County.

In 2009, the school district was rated "recognized" by the Texas Education Agency.

Schools
Florence High (Grades 9-12)
FHS operates one of the very few school-run meat markets in the country, and the only one in Texas operated by a Class AAA  school.
Florence Middle (Grades 6-8)
Florence Elementary (Grades PK-5)

References

External links
 

School districts in Williamson County, Texas
School districts in Bell County, Texas